Manide is a Philippine language spoken near the province of Camarines Norte in Bicol region and Quezon in Southern Tagalog of southern Luzon in the Philippines. Manide is spoken by nearly 4,000 Negrito people, most of whom reside in the towns of Labo, Jose Panganiban, and Paracale.

History 
Between 1903 and 1924, John M. Garvan (1963) visited Negrito Filipino communities in the region of Luzon and recorded the name Manide.

Many of the Manide population children still grow up speaking Manide.

Classification 
Manide is the most divergent out of the three other Negrito languages in Southern Luzon, namely Inagta Rinconada, Inagta Partido, and Alabat. In a survey of 1000 lexical items, 285 appeared to be unique, including new coinages which are forms that experienced semantic and or phonological shifts over time. In comparison, other Negrito languages such as Batak, Inagta Rinconada/Partido, Mamanwa, or Inati have a cognate rate of over 90% with neighboring non-Negrito languages.

The language genetically closest to Manide is the Inagta Alabat language. Katabangan may have also been related according to Zubiri.

Distribution 
Lobel (2010) shows the separation of towns with Manide populations.

 Camarines Norte
 Basud – 2 communities, 175 speakers
 Labo – 9 communities, 1,542 speakers
 Jose Panganiban – 3 communities, 568 speakers
 Paracale – 4 communities, 581 speakers
 Santa Elena – 1 community, 110 speakers
 Capalonga – 2 communities, 245 speakers
 San Lorenzo Riuz – 1 community, 45 speakers
 Quezon
 Calauag – 1 community
 Lopez – 1 community
 Camarines Sur
 Ragay – 1 community, 200 speakers
 Lupi – 1 community, 197 speakers

Phonology

Historical reflexes 
Reflexes are words, sounds, or writing systems which are derived from previous, older elements or systems.

Reflex of PMP *q 
'mouth'.

Reflex of PMP *R 
The reflex most likely comes from borrowed items in Tagalog. For example, Manide   'new' is a reflex of PPH * with the same meaning.

Reflex of PMP *s 

Reflex of PMP *d, *j, and *z 
The reflexes of Proto-Malayo-Polynesian *d, *j, and *z are all , with some exceptions for *j and *z.

An example for *j: Manide   'name' < PPH *
An example for *d: Manide   'catch, capture' < PPH *
An example for *z: Manide   'teach' < PMP * 'point'

Reflexes of PMP *ə. 

Verb morphology 
Manide is a reduced-focus language because it primarily uses mag- for the actor focus and -an for the location focus, while -en takes place of the functions from Proto Malayo Polynesian *-ən and *i-, thus marking object focus. There are two present forms, with the first being possessive. The second present form is used for habitual functions. In Southern Luzon, Manide is the only language that uses CVC reduplication.

Pronouns 
Pronouns in Manide make the same contrasts as in other Philippine languages.

Vowel shifts 
Vowel shifts are systematic sound changes in the pronunciation of vowel sounds. In Manide, there are vowel shifts following voiced stops  and glides . Low vowel fronting, back vowel fronting, and low vowel backing are all present in Manide.

Fronting refers to a change in the articulation of a vowel with shifts to vowels further forward in the mouth. (i.e., the position of the highest point of the tongue during its pronunciation).

Low vowel fronting 
Fronting may occur due to assimilation to nearby sounds, or it may form independently. It is part of a feature among many Negrito Filipino languages from northern Luzon to Manide.

Back vowel fronting 
It is related to low vowel fronting as back vowel fronting happens after , but there are few occurrences after *b.

Manide shows 16 different forms of back vowel fronting, which generally happens after *t and *l.

Low vowel backing 
Low vowel backing is unique to Manide, as it is not known to occur in any other language of the Philippines. Ten occurrences of low vowel backing of the shift *a to  have been recorded.

Case markers 
Case markers in Manide are similar to those of other Philippine languages. The case markers show the relationships of nouns and noun phrases to a verb. The most common situations are genitive, nominative, and oblique. Something very unusual is that Manide uses the same case markers for personal names just as used with common nouns. There are no 'personal' case markers in Manide for in the plural form, only the singular form.

References 

Central Philippine languages
Aeta languages
Languages of Camarines Norte
Languages of Camarines Sur
Languages of Quezon